Agaeocera gentilis is a species of metallic wood-boring beetle in the family Buprestidae. It is found in Central America and North America.

Subspecies
These two subspecies belong to the species Agaeocera gentilis:
 Agaeocera gentilis gentilis (Horn, 1885)
 Agaeocera gentilis peninsularis Van Dyke, 1945

References

Further reading

 
 
 

Buprestidae
Articles created by Qbugbot
Beetles described in 1885